Little Movements is an album by German double bassist and composer Eberhard Weber recorded in 1980 and released on the ECM label.

Reception
The Allmusic review by Scott Yanow awarded the album 3 stars, stating, "the generally introspective music develops slowly and the occasional fiery moments are outnumbered by the quiet spots. A close listen does reveal some fine playing but most jazz collectors will probably think of this set as being superior background music".

Track listing
All compositions by Eberhard Weber except where noted.
 "The Last Stage of a Long Journey" – 9:36   
 "Bali" (Rainer Brüninghaus) – 12:26   
 "A Dark Spell" – 8:23   
 "Little Movements" – 7:26   
 ""No Trees?" He Said" – 5:01

Personnel
Eberhard Weber – bass
Charlie Mariano – soprano saxophone, flute
Rainer Brüninghaus – piano, synthesizer
John Marshall – drums, percussion

References

ECM Records albums
Eberhard Weber albums
1980 albums
Albums produced by Manfred Eicher